Clifford William Myers (23 September 1946 – 8 February 2019) was an English professional footballer who played in the Football League for Torquay United, Charlton Athletic and Brentford as a utility player. He went on to have a long career in non-League football and is regarded as a cult hero amongst the supporters of Yeovil Town, for whom he made 329 appearances.

Personal life 
Myers' son and grandson (Chris and Spencer respectively) both became footballers. Myers began running a Torquay-based contract cleaning company in the late 1970s and moved to Rhodes in 1991. He owned the Sunburnt Arms bar in Lindos.

Honours 
Yeovil Town
Southern League Premier Division: 1970–71

Career statistics

References

1946 births
2019 deaths
English footballers
English Football League players
Brentford F.C. players
Footballers from Southwark
Association football utility players
Charlton Athletic F.C. players
Yeovil Town F.C. players
Torquay United F.C. players
Weymouth F.C. players
Taunton Town F.C. players
Salisbury City F.C. players
Minehead A.F.C. players
Southern Football League players
British expatriates in Greece
Association football midfielders
Association football forwards